The Kansas City, Memphis & Birmingham Railroad is a historic railroad that operated in the southern United States.

The company was created by consolidation in 1887 from a line of the same name (which was originally incorporated in Mississippi on February 18, 1886) and the Memphis and Birmingham Railway.  The KCM&B operated between Memphis, Tennessee and Birmingham, Alabama.  The Kansas City, Fort Scott and Memphis Railroad owned 50% of the stock in the KCM&B and the line operated as an extension to the KCFS&M.

Both railroads were operationally absorbed into the St. Louis and San Francisco Railroad (the "Frisco") in 1896.  In 1901 the KCFS&M was purchased by the Frisco and the KCM&B was leased by the Frisco in 1903.  A formal transfer of KCM&B assets to the Frisco did not take place until 1928.

References

Western Historical Manuscript Collection - Rolla - University of Missouri-Rolla "Guide to the Historical Records of the St. Louis-San Francisco Railway Company" Retrieved 16 September 2005

Defunct Tennessee railroads
Defunct Mississippi railroads
Defunct Alabama railroads
Predecessors of the St. Louis–San Francisco Railway
Railway companies established in 1886
Railway companies disestablished in 1928